Allognathus campanyonii is a species of land snail in the family Helicidae, the true snails.

Subspecies
Five subspecies are currently recognized.

Distribution 
It is endemic to the Balearic Islands. It has also been introduced in several localities in the Iberian Peninsula (Banyuls-sur-Mer, Barcelona, Sitges and Tarragona) but, nowadays, only the population from Tarragona city walls is still alive.

The distribution of this taxon follows a phylogeographical pattern, where distribution ranges of the five subspecies are well delimited. Two subspecies are present in Mallorca, two in Eivissa and another one in Menorca. Allognathus campanyonii campanyonii is mainly distributed in the lower areas of Mallorca Island as well as in the Cabrera archipelago. Besides, the populations from Tarragona city walls belongs to this phylogroup. In Mallorca, we can also find the taxa A. campanyonii n. ssp., that is present in the southern Tramuntana Mountains. A. c. tanitianus and A. c. pythiusensis are the two taxa distributed in the Pityusic Islands, where the first one is present in Eivissa main island and Formentera whereas, the second one is present in Ses Bledes archipelago, although it is also present in several populations in Eivissa main Island. Finally, in Menorca Island we can find A. c. minoricensis, where two main phylogroups were recovered.

References 

 Bank, R. A.; Neubert, E. (2017). Checklist of the land and freshwater Gastropoda of Europe. Last update: 16 July 2017

External links 
 http://luisjavierchueca.com/research-3/allognathus/

Helicidae
Molluscs of the Atlantic Ocean
Gastropods described in 1839